The tyrannine woodcreeper (Dendrocincla tyrannina) is a species of bird in the family Furnariidae.
It is found in Bolivia, Colombia, Ecuador, Peru, and Venezuela.
Its natural habitat is subtropical or tropical moist montane forest.

Gallery

References

tyrannine woodcreeper
Birds of the Northern Andes
tyrannine woodcreeper
Taxonomy articles created by Polbot